Nicolás Adrián González Szoke (born 16 January 1994) is an Argentine footballer who plays as a defender for Berazategui.

Career
Banfield were González's first senior club. He made his Banfield debut in the Copa Argentina versus Central Norte on 13 March 2013, having been an unused substitute a year earlier for a tie against Atlético de Rafaela. He left Banfield in 2014 after failing to make a league appearance, but was once an unused substitute for a Primera B Nacional match with Almirante Brown. Upon departing Banfield, González had a spell with Torneo Federal A club Textil Mandiyú between 2014 and 2015, making his senior debut in a defeat to Sol de América. 2015 saw him join Primera B Nacional team Villa Dálmine, but he left a year later without featuring.

On 13 July 2016, González signed for Primera B Metropolitana club Excursionistas. He made his professional debut on 4 September versus Tristán Suárez and scored his first career goal in the process in a 3–0 victory. He went onto make twenty appearances for Excursionistas as they were relegated to Primera C Metropolitana. He departed soon after and joined fellow Primera C Metropolitana side Cambaceres in 2017, which preceded a move to Berazategui a year later.

Career statistics
.

References

External links

1994 births
Living people
Place of birth missing (living people)
Argentine footballers
Association football defenders
Argentine Primera División players
Primera Nacional players
Torneo Federal A players
Primera B Metropolitana players
Primera C Metropolitana players
Club Atlético Banfield footballers
Textil Mandiyú footballers
Villa Dálmine footballers
CA Excursionistas players
Defensores de Cambaceres footballers
A.D. Berazategui footballers